The Oil Rag was a promotional newspaper issued by the Australian rock band Midnight Oil to coincide with studio albums and tours. There were six volumes of the Oil Rag:

 Vol. I (1987) "What Midnight Oil Means to Australia", 8 pages, for background information on the band
 Vol. II (1988) "Consolidated Oil", edited by Denise Officer-Brewster and Andrew McMillan, 8 pages, for the album Diesel and Dust
 Vol. III (1990) "With Axes In Its Eyes", edited by Denise Officer-Brewster, 8 pages, for the album Blue Sky Mining
 Vol. IV (1993) "Oils Return to Orbit", edited by Ed St John, 8 pages, for the album Earth and Sun and Moon
 Vol. V (1996), 4 pages, for the album Breathe
 Vol. VI (1998) "Redneck Wonderland Advocate", edited by Mark Dodshon for the album Redneck Wonderland

There also was a 1983 release of the same concept for the album 10, 9, 8, 7, 6, 5, 4, 3, 2, 1 ("Oil Change", 4 pages) that was not yet officially named Oil Rag. The Oil Rag aimed to keep fans up to date on the musical and political activities of the band and were anti-corporate and anti-fashion. They, among others, contained pictures, magazine articles, album lyrics, album and concert reviews and band interviews, and were distributed with promotional album releases or in response to fan mail.

References

Midnight Oil
Defunct newspapers published in New South Wales